First National Bank Building commonly referred to as Penn Tower is a low-rise commercial building located in downtown Williamsport, Pennsylvania. It was built in 1913 and at the time it was the tallest in the city and second tallest in the state.

History
Penn Tower was built in 1913 and upon completion was the tallest building in the city and second in the state. Through the year the building was converted from a factory to apartments to commercial space and is now a commercial building.

Design
The building's structural system is made of steel and the facade is brick in an applied masonry system.

See also
Genetti Hotel

References

Buildings and structures in Williamsport, Pennsylvania